Etymosphaerion unicolor is a species of beetle in the family Cerambycidae, the only species in the genus Etymosphaerion.

References

Elaphidiini